Rudiment may refer to:
 
Rudiment, one of a set of basic patterns used in rudimental drumming
Rudiments of music, a technical term for the basic elements of music theory and the terminology used to describe them
Rudiment, an incompletely developed organ, a form of vestigiality
The Rudiments, a 1990s ska/punk rock band signed to Asian Man Records